Wang Xiaoyun (born 1966) is a Chinese cryptographer, mathematician, and computer scientist. She is a professor in the Department of Mathematics and System Science of Shandong University and an academician of the Chinese Academy of Sciences.

Early life and education 
Wang was born in Zhucheng, Shandong Province. She gained bachelor (1987), master (1990) and doctorate (1993) degrees at Shandong University, and subsequently lectured in the mathematics department from 1993. Her doctoral advisor was Pan Chengdong. Wang was appointed assistant professor in 1995, and full professor in 2001. She became the Chen Ning Yang Professor of the Center for Advanced Study, Tsinghua University in 2005.

Career and research 
At the rump session of CRYPTO 2004, she and co-authors demonstrated collision attacks against MD5, SHA-0 and other related hash functions (a collision occurs when two distinct messages result in the same hash function output). They received a standing ovation for their work.

In February 2005, it was reported that Wang and co-authors Yiqun Lisa Yin and Hongbo Yu had found a method to find collisions in the SHA-1 hash function, which is used in many of today's mainstream security products. Their work was published at the CRYPTO '05 conference. In August 2005, an improved attack on SHA-1, discovered by Wang, Andrew Yao and Frances Yao, was announced at the CRYPTO conference rump session. The time complexity of the new attack is claimed to be 263.

Awards and honors 
In 2019, she was named a Fellow of the International Association for Cryptologic Research (IACR) for "For essential contributions to the cryptanalysis and design of hash functions, and for service to the IACR." In 2019, she became the first female winner of China's Future Science Prize for her pioneering contribution in cryptography.

References

External links
 Xiaoyun Wang

1966 births
Living people
Chinese cryptographers
Chinese women computer scientists
Chinese women mathematicians
Educators from Shandong
Mathematicians from Shandong
Members of the Chinese Academy of Sciences
Modern cryptographers
People from Zhucheng
Shandong University alumni
Academic staff of Shandong University
Academic staff of Tsinghua University
Women cryptographers